The Haunting of Hill House is a 1959 gothic horror novel by American author Shirley Jackson. A finalist for the National Book Award and considered one of the best literary ghost stories published during the 20th century, it has been made into two feature films and a play, and is the basis of a Netflix series. Jackson's novel relies on terror rather than horror to elicit emotion in the reader, using complex relationships between the mysterious events in the house and the characters' psyches.

The book is dedicated to Leonard Brown, Jackson's English teacher at Syracuse University.

Development
The author decided to write "a ghost story" after reading about a group of nineteenth century "psychic researchers" who studied a house and somberly reported their supposedly scientific findings to the Society for Psychic Research. What Jackson discovered in their "dry reports was not the story of a haunted house, it was the story of several earnest, I believe misguided, certainly determined people, with their differing motivations and background." Excited by the prospect of creating her own haunted house and the characters to explore it, she launched into research. She later claimed to have found a picture in a magazine of a California house she believed was suitably haunted-looking. She asked her mother, who lived in California, to help find information about the dwelling. According to Jackson, her mother identified the house as one the author's own great-great-grandfather, an architect who had designed some of San Francisco's oldest buildings, had built. Jackson also read volume upon volume of traditional ghost stories while preparing to write her own, "No one can get into a novel about a haunted house without hitting the subject of reality head-on; either I have to believe in ghosts, which I do, or I have to write another kind of novel altogether."- Paula Guran

As part of her process, Jackson sketched floor plans of the downstairs and upstairs of Hill House and a rendering of the exterior.

Summary
Hill House is a mansion in a location that is never specified but is between many hills. The story concerns four main characters: Dr. John Montague, an investigator of the supernatural; Eleanor Vance, a shy young woman who resents caring for her demanding, disabled mother; Theodora, a bohemian artist, and Luke Sanderson, the young heir to Hill House, who is host to the others.

Montague hopes to find scientific evidence of the existence of the supernatural. He rents Hill House for a summer and invites as his guests several people whom he has chosen because of their experiences with paranormal events. Of these, only Eleanor and Theodora accept. Eleanor travels to the house, where she and Theodora will live in isolation with Montague and Luke.

Hill House has two caretakers, Mr. and Mrs. Dudley, who refuse to stay near the house at night. The four overnight visitors begin to form friendships as Montague explains the building's history, which encompasses suicide and other violent deaths.

All four of the inhabitants begin to experience strange events while in the house, including unseen noises and ghosts roaming the halls at night, strange writing on the walls, and other unexplained events. Eleanor tends to experience phenomena to which the others are oblivious. At the same time, Eleanor may be losing touch with reality, and the narrative implies that at least some of what Eleanor witnesses may be products of her imagination. Another implied possibility is that Eleanor possesses a subconscious telekinetic ability that is itself the cause of many of the disturbances experienced by her and other members of the investigative team (which might indicate there is no ghost in the house at all). This possibility is suggested especially by references early in the novel to Eleanor's childhood memories about episodes of a poltergeist-like entity that seemed to involve mainly her.

Later in the novel, the haughty Mrs. Montague and her companion Arthur Parker, the headmaster of a boys' school, arrive to spend a weekend at Hill House and to help investigate it. They, too, are interested in the supernatural, including séances and spirit writing. Unlike the other four characters, they do not experience anything supernatural, although some of Mrs. Montague's alleged spirit writings seem to communicate with Eleanor.

Much of the supernatural phenomena that occur are described only vaguely, or else are partly hidden from the characters themselves. Eleanor and Theodora are in a bedroom with an unseen force trying the door, and Eleanor believes after the fact that the hand she was holding in the darkness was not Theodora's. In one episode, as Theodora and Eleanor walk outside Hill House at night, they see a ghostly family picnic that seems to be taking place in daylight. Theodora screams in fear for Eleanor to run, warning her not to look back, though the book never explains what Theodora sees.

By this point in the book, it is becoming clear to the characters that the house is beginning to possess Eleanor. Fearing for her safety, Montague and Luke declare that she must leave. Eleanor, however, regards the house as her home and resists. Montague and Luke force her into her car; she bids them farewell and drives off, but before leaving the property grounds she propels the car into a large oak tree to her implied death.

Reception and legacy
In a New York Times review in 1959, Edmund Fuller wrote, "With her 'conceit' of Hill House, whether pretty be the name for it or not, Shirley Jackson proves again that she is the finest master currently practicing in the genre of the cryptic, haunted tale."

Stephen King, in his book Danse Macabre (1981), a non-fiction review of the horror genre, lists The Haunting of Hill House as one of the finest horror novels of the late 20th century and provides a lengthy review. In his review column for The Magazine of Fantasy & Science Fiction, Damon Knight selected the novel as one of the 10 best genre books of 1959, declaring it "in a class by itself."

Reappraising the book in The Guardian in 2010, Sophie Missing wrote, "Jackson treats her material – which could be reduced to penny dreadful stuff in less deft hands – with great skill and subtlety. […] The horror inherent in the novel does not lie in Hill House (monstrous though it is) or the events that take place within it, but in the unexplored recesses of its characters' – and its readers' – minds. This is perhaps why it remains the definitive haunted house story".

In 2018, The New York Times polled 13 writers to choose the scariest book of fiction they have ever read, and Carmen Maria Machado and Neil Gaiman both chose The Haunting of Hill House.

Carmen Maria Machado wrote in The Atlantic about her experience discovering The Haunting of Hill House. She was at a writer's retreat while working on her short story "The Resident," and was told her story reminded readers of Shirley Jackson. Having read little of Jackson, Machado decided to read Hill House: "When I went back home to Philly, I picked up a copy. And I just devoured it. I read it in one sitting. I started reading one night, and when my girlfriend (now wife) went to bed I just kept reading. It scared the shit out of me. Even though the events that appear to be supernatural activity are few and far between, those scenes are so chillingly written—as if Jackson was describing a phenomenon she'd seen before and really understood. The book's particular brand of surreality felt, to me, like that experience of walking home from a party a little bit drunk, when the world somehow seems sharper and clearer and weirder."

Sara Century, writing for SyFy, pointed out the queer themes of the book, specifically calling out the example of Theo as a queer character who goes against the "bury your gays" trope: "Theo stands out for being an imperfect, fallible queer woman consistently being subjected to life-threatening situations yet still walking away from them, evolving rather than fading away."

Adaptations

Film

The novel has been adapted to film twice, in 1963 and again in 1999, both times under the title The Haunting. The 1963 version is a relatively faithful adaptation and received critical praise. The 1999 version, considerably different from the novel and widely panned by critics, is an overt fantasy horror in which all the main characters are terrorized and two are killed by explicitly supernatural deaths. It was also parodied in Scary Movie 2 (2001).

The plot of The Legend of Hell House and the book on which it is based, Hell House, both written by Richard Matheson, have several details in common with Jackson's novel (and the 1963 movie adaptation The Haunting) in which a party of four (some psychic, some skeptical, some British, some Americans) stay in an extremely haunted Gothic mansion with a terrible history, for the purposes of scientific study; all are plagued by unseen terrors.

Theater
It was first adapted for the stage in 1964 by F. Andrew Leslie. In 2015, Anthony Neilson prepared a new stage adaptation for Sonia Friedman and Hammer for production at the Liverpool Playhouse.

Radio
In 1997, The Haunting of Hill House was abridged for radio by Alison Joseph and broadcast on BBC Radio 4 in eight 15-minute episodes, read by Emma Fielding.

Television

A loose television adaptation was released in 2018 to critical acclaim. It changed many elements from the novel, keeping mainly its Hill House setting, Mr and Mrs Dudley, and a few character names, but shifted the focus to members of a singular haunted "Crain family." It was directed by Mike Flanagan and was produced for Netflix. Varying from the novel, the series depicted the married couple and their five children being terrorized by the house for decades of their lives.

References

Further reading
1984, The Haunting of Hill House, Penguin,

External links

 
 "Shirley Jackson: 'Delight in What I Fear'" by Paula Guran
 "Shirley Jackson & The Haunting of Hill House" by Paula Guran
 

American horror novels
American novels adapted into films
1959 American novels
Novels by Shirley Jackson
American gothic novels
Ghost novels
Viking Press books
Books by Shirley Jackson